I81B4U was an EP from Boston hardcore punk / speed metal band, Gang Green. It was released in 1988, after the previous year's debut for Roadrunner Records, You Got It and before 1989's release, Older... Budweiser.

The title is a reference to Van Halen's album, OU812 released in the same year. I81B4U translates phonetically to "I Ate One Before You".

Overview
This EP shows the band's musical style as an intermediate point between hardcore punk and speed metal – also known as crossover thrash. Sing-along choruses and distinguished riffs combined with proficient guitar solos are trademarks of both of the former subgenres.

A few songs featured the band's trademark melodic mutant rock and roll style; "Bartender" and "Lost Chapter" have frequently been played during live shows.

Tracks 3 and 5 detail the love of loose women; the lyrics, including titles, contain noticeable sexual innuendo.

Track listing
All songs written by Chris Doherty, unless stated
"Bartender"	–	3:16
"Lost Chapter" (Joe Gittleman, Doherty)	–	2:59
"Rent"	–	2:07
"Put Her On Top"	–	3:42
"Cum in U"	–	3:02

Credits
 Chris Doherty – vocals, guitar
 Fritz Ericson – guitar
 Joe Gittleman – bass
 Brian Betzger – drums
 Recorded and mixed in 1988 at Newbury Sound, Boston, Massachusetts, USA
 Tracks 1, 2, and 4 produced by Daniel Rey
 Tracks 3 and 5 produced by Ross Humphrey
 Engineered by Drew Townson
 Mastered by Tom Coyne at Frankford/Wayne, New York City, USA
 Illustrations by Joel Adams

External links
Taang Records band page
Trouserpress entry for Gang Green
More info on Gang Green

Gang Green albums
1988 EPs
Albums produced by Daniel Rey